2020 Depok mayoral election is the general election to elect the Mayor and Deputy Mayor of Depok for the period 2021 – 2024. This election was held by the Depok City Election Commission (KPU) which was held on December 9, 2020.

Background 
This election is the fourth regional head election which is conducted directly elected by the community. Mohammad Idris who was elected as mayor in the 2015 election can apply for re-nomination as Mayor of Depok in this election. In addition, the Mayor and Deputy Mayor of Depok applied for 71 days of leave from 26 September 2020 to 5 December 2020. Thus, the Governor of West Java Ridwan Kamil appointed the Head of the West Java Provincial Education Office, Dedi Supandi as the Acting Mayor of Depok.

Election 
Regional General Elections Commission (KPUD) Depok City increased the number of polling stations (TPS) due to the quota limiting the maximum quota for the number of voters in each TPS, which is 500 peoples. Initially, the TPS had 3,417 places, but the number of TPS became 4,015 places. The determination of the voter quota made the number of TPS in Depok City increase by 598 points or around 17.5 percent. Included in the ballot box are 4,049 boxes. and ballot papers totaling 2,262,051 sheets or an increase of 2.5% as a reserve from the number of the Final Voters List (DPT), meanwhile, the number of damaged ballots was 137 and had been replaced by the ballot provider. A total of 16,060 voting booths have also been prepared in each polling station (TPS). The ballot boxes and voting booths are then stored in the KPUD warehouse in Depok City in Tugu, Cimanggis, Depok. In fact, the KPUD of Depok City is willing to go to COVID-19 patients to be able to exercise their voting rights. The voters who became COVID-19 patients totaled 2,280 people with details of 1,280 patients being treated in hospital and 1,152 people who were doing self-isolation or people without symptoms.

Date 
The central government with DPR RI agreed to change the agenda simultaneous regional head elections in 2020 and set a date for simultaneous elections on 9 December 2020 after previously being postponed on 23 September 2020 due to COVID-19 pandemic. There are three election date options in delaying the simultaneous regional elections, namely 9 December 2020 with pre-voting Pilkada stages at the end of May 2020, 17 March 2021, and 29 September 2021.

President Joko Widodo emphasized the Presidential Decree of the Republic of Indonesia Number 22 of 2020 concerning Voting Day for the Election of Governors and Deputy Governors, Regents and Deputy Regents, as well as Mayors and Deputy Mayors in 2020, the election date is declared on December 9, 2020 national holidays. Continuing this decision, the Depok City Government also issued Mayor Circular Letter Number 270/581-ORB, concerning Depok City Head Election (Pilkada) Day 9 December 2020 as a holiday.

Nomination 
The following are the pairs of nominees that have been appointed as candidates for mayor and deputy mayor by the Depok City Regional General Election Commission (KPUD) on September 23, 2020:

Political Map

Parliamentary Chairs 
Results of 2019 Indonesian general election in Depok City there were 9 Political Parties with a total of 50 seats in Depok City People's Representative Council, namely:

Alliance 
In this election, there are two camps that will carry candidates for mayor and deputy mayor candidates, including the Gerindra & PDI-P agreed to support the mayor candidate who came from the Gerindra Party, while the Deputy Mayor's candidate came from the PDI-P and the four parties that agreed to build the Depok Organized Coalition on 1 February 2020.

Survey Results

After Candidacy

Before Candidacy

Candidate for Mayor

Candidate for Deputy Mayor

Results

Quick Count

Official Results 

|- bgcolor="#E9E9E9" align="center"
! colspan="2" align="left" | Candidate
! align="left" | Running mate
! align="left" | Parties
! width="75" | Votes
! width="30" | %
|-
| bgcolor="#B79174" |
| align="left" | Pradi Supriatna
| align="left" | Afifah Alia
| align="left" | Great Indonesia Movement Party
| 
| 
|-
| bgcolor="#FE5000" |
| align="left" | Mohammad Idris
| align="left" | Imam Budi Hartono
| align="left" | Prosperous Justice Party
| 
| 
|-
| colspan="6" bgcolor="#E9E9E9" |
|-
! colspan="4" align="left" | Total
! 
! 
|-
| colspan="6" bgcolor="#E9E9E9" |
|-
| colspan="4" style="text-align:left;"| Valid votes
|  || 
|-
| colspan="4" style="text-align:left;"| Spoilt and null votes
|  || 
|-
| colspan="4" style="text-align:left;"| Turnout
|  || 
|-
| colspan="4" style="text-align:left;"| Abstentions
|  || 
|-
| colspan="4" style="text-align:left;"| Registered voters
| 
| style="background:#E9E9E9;"|
|-
| colspan="6" bgcolor="#E9E9E9" |
|-
| colspan="6" align="left" | Source: KPU
|}

Gallery

References

External links 

 General Election Commission of Depok City
 Local Government of Depok City

Campaign team websites
 Pradi-Afifah 
 Idris-Imam 

Depok
Depok
Elections in West Java
Depok
December 2020 events in Indonesia